Hippotion leucocephalus is a moth of the  family Sphingidae. It is probably found in Africa, but the identity of this taxon, which is known only from the holotype female, is unclear, especially as Röber stated it was presumably a species found in Africa. It may be a better match to Hippotion aurora aurora than to Hippotion celerio, but the matter will only be settled by examination of the holotype, the current depository of which is unknown.

References

 Pinhey, E (1962): Hawk Moths of Central and Southern Africa. Longmans Southern Africa, Cape Town.

Hippotion
Moths described in 1929